Chalkmuli High School is a public secondary school in Naogaon District, Bangladesh. It is situated in the village Chalk Muli, in the northern part of Patnitala Upazila. It was established in 1972 with 100 students and currently serves about 256. The founder of Chalkmuli High School is Khitis Chandra Mondol.

Its  campus has two-story buildings, which is used for administrative and academic purpose that also includes a library enriched with more than 1000 books.

Chalkmuli High School was nationalized in 1991.

See also
 Naogaon Zilla School
 Nazipur Government College

References

High schools in Bangladesh
Educational institutions established in 1972
1972 establishments in Bangladesh
Schools in Naogaon District